Shock Tactics  is the third studio album by British heavy metal band Samson, released in 1981. It was vocalist Bruce Dickinson's final album with the band before joining Iron Maiden (who were coincidentally recording Killers, their last album with Paul Di'Anno, in the same studio at the same time as Samson).

Track listing
All tracks by Bruce Dickinson, Paul Samson, Chris Aylmer and Thunderstick, except "Riding with the Angels" by Russ Ballard.

2001 re-issue bonus tracks

Personnel

Samson
 "Bruce Bruce" Dickinson – vocals
 Paul Samson – guitar
 Chris Aylmer – bass guitar 
 Thunderstick – drums

Production
Tony Platt - producer, engineer
Graham Carmichael - assistant engineer

Re-issues
Shock Tactics has seen several CD re-issues over the years.  The first came in 1989 courtesy of German company Repertoire, in 1991 via Grand Slamm in the U.S. and in 1992 through Jimco in Japan, followed by Bruce Dickinson's short-lived Air Raid label in 2000. The most recent CD re-issues on Castle/Sanctuary (2001), Dissonance Productions (2017), Japan's Wasabi Records (2018), and Brazil's Hellion Records (2020) all contain 3 bonus tracks, "Little Big Man", "Pyramid to the Stars" and "Losing My Grip", not included on the earlier editions. The original 9-song album has also seen vinyl re-issues in the UK and Europe through Back On Black and in the U.S. via Real Gone Music, both in 2017.

References

1981 albums
Samson (band) albums
Albums produced by Tony Platt
RCA Records albums